Ivar Must (born 7 May 1961 in Tallinn as Igor Tsõganov) is an Estonian composer and music producer.  He composed "Everybody", which won the 2001 Eurovision Song Contest.

Eurovision Song Contest entries
"Nagu Merelaine" by Silvi Vrait, Estonia, (Eurovision Song Contest 1994), 24th place
"Everybody" by Tanel Padar and Dave Benton, Estonia, (Eurovision Song Contest 2001), 1st place

References

1961 births
Living people
Estonian songwriters
Eurovision Song Contest winners
Musicians from Tallinn
20th-century Estonian composers
21st-century Estonian composers